Al Ain English Speaking School (AAESS) is the only coeducational independent all-through school in Al Ain, catering for all ages three to 18; Nursery, Primary, Secondary and Sixth Form. The school was founded in 1976 by the construction company Balfour group who were commissioned to build part of the infrastructure of Al Ain's drainage system. The school started in a local villa, and helped by the ALGECO group.  Mr Colin Jones became the first governor with Mrs Gill Didcott becoming the inaugural Principal. The school was first called the "Balfour School", before building on the site that is today in 1978 and becoming Al Ain English Speaking School. It has been expanded and enhanced considerably since then due to its popularity. The school was significantly expanded during the summer of 2014 and then again in 2016 with a new primary building being completed for the start of the academic term of 2019, with independent Primary Science Labs an ICT Labs being completed.

In 2017, the school celebrated a student gaining the highest award in the world for GCSE French, and in 2019, its first student gaining the Gold Duke of Edinburgh Award alongside the highest in the World for A/S Maths (Cambridge). In 2020,  Zaheer Abass, Principal of the Secondary School and Physics teacher, was also awarded the inaugural ADEK Teacher of the Year Award.

In May 2022, the school became the first school in Al Ain to be endorsed by the British Government and be quality assured by Ofsted, gaining the British Schools Overseas award and also gained the 'Very Good' inspection grading by Irtiqa'a.

The curriculum and approach to teaching and learning are based on the English educational model, with the inclusion of Arabic Language, Arabic Social Studies, and Islamic Education (for Muslim children).

The school is owned by Mohammed Al Ghussien who is the CEO of the Bin Harmal consortium, Stella Investments and part owner of the Abu Dhabi University.

The Principal, Andrew Thomas, was Assistant Principal at Paignton Community & Sports Academy for nearly 17 years, and has been published in many journals for his work in education, having collaborated with Dr Gareth Stratton, who sits on the NICE committee, in the UK.  Thomas has also given conferences at Premiership football clubs in the UK including Chelsea, Aston Villa, and Arsenal as well as the British Educational Research Association (BERA) and at the British Educational Training and Technology Show Middle East (BETT). He was also nominated for the Teacher of the Year Award in the UK.

The Board of Trustees include Leadership Team – Kanad Hospital, Dr Tim Fincher, eye surgeon & CEO at Oasis Hospital &  Dr Alex Tinson, Camel Vet Specialist to the Sheikh (Director of Laboratories, Department of President Affairs's, UAE).  Additional trustees include Dr. Salem Al Darmaki, the Advisor to the UAE Health Minister.

External links

References

Educational institutions established in 1979
Schools in the Emirate of Abu Dhabi
Buildings and structures in Al Ain
Education in Al Ain
International schools in the United Arab Emirates
1979 establishments in the United Arab Emirates